Apocalypse is a literary genre in which a supernatural being reveals cosmic mysteries or the future to a human intermediary. The means of mediation include dreams, visions and heavenly journeys, and they typically feature symbolic imagery drawn from the Hebrew Bible, cosmological and (pessimistic) historical surveys, the division of time into periods, esoteric numerology, and claims of ecstasy and inspiration. Almost all are written under pseudonyms (false names), claiming as author a venerated hero from previous centuries, as with Book of Daniel, composed during the 2nd century BCE but bearing the name of the legendary Daniel. 

Eschatology, from Greek eschatos, last, concerns expectations of the end of the present age, and apocalyptic eschatology is the application of the apocalyptic world-view to the end of the world, when God will punish the wicked and reward the faithful. An apocalypse will often contain much eschatological material, but need not: the baptism of Jesus in Matthew's gospel, for example, can be considered apocalyptic in that the heavens open for the presence of a divine mediator (the dove representing the spirit of God) and a voice communicates supernatural information, but there is no eschatological element.

Scholars have identified examples of the genre ranging from the mid-2nd century BCE to the 2nd century CE, and examples are to be found in Persian and Greco-Roman literature as well as Jewish and Christian. The sole clear case in the Jewish Bible (Old Testament) is chapters 7-12 of the Book of Daniel, but there are many examples from non-canonical Jewish works; the Book of Revelation is the only apocalypse in the New Testament, but passages reflecting the genre are to be found in the gospels and in nearly all the genuine Pauline epistles.

Definition and history
"Apocalypse" has come to be used popularly as a synonym for catastrophe, but the Greek word apokálypsis, from which it is derived, means a revelation. It has been defined by John J Collins as "a genre of revelatory literature with a narrative framework, in which a revelation is mediated by an otherworldly being to a human recipient, disclosing a transcendent reality which is both temporal, in that it envisages eschatological salvation, and spatial, insofar as it involves another, supernatural world." Collins later refined his definition by adding that apocalypse "is intended to interpret present, earthly circumstances in light of the supernatural world and of the future, and to influence both the understanding and the behaviour of the audience by means of divine authority." 

The genre of Jewish and Christian apocalypse flourished c.250 BCE-250 CE, but its antecedents can be traced back much further, in the Jewish prophetic and wisdom traditions (e.g., Ezekiel 1-3 and Zechariah 1-6), and in the mythologies of the Ancient Near East, which have left a legacy of symbology (e.g., the sea as a symbol of chaos in Daniel 7 and Revelation 13:1). Zoroastrian dualism may also have played a role. The reasons for its rise are obscure, but there seems to be a connection to times of crisis, such as the 2nd century BCE persecution of the Jews reflected in Daniel's final vision, or the destruction of the Temple in 70 CE reflected in 4 Ezra and 2 Baruch.

Examples
Jewish apocalypses include chapters 7–12 of the Book of Daniel (the previous chapters do not fall into the apocalyptic genre) and non-canonical works such as the Book of Enoch, 2 Enoch, 4 Ezra, 2 Baruch, 3 Baruch, the Apocalypse of Abraham, the Testament of Levi 2-5, the Apocalypse of Zephaniah, and portions of the Book of Jubilees and the Testament of Abraham; these are all Second Temple works. Christian apocalypses include the Revelation of John, the "little apocalypse" of Mark 13:5-37 and the equivalent passages in Matthew 24:4-36 and Luke 21:8-36 in which Jesus supposedly predicts the destruction of Jerusalem and the coming of the abomination of desolation, and various passages in the Pauline epistles, the pseudo-Pauline 2 Thessalonians, and other letters such as Jude, James, and 1 and 2 Peter.

Characteristics

Apocalyptic revelations are typically mediated through such means as dreams and visions (the ancient world did not distinguish between these), angels, and heavenly journeys. These serve to connect two sets of axes, the spatial axis which has God and the heavenly realm above and the human world below, and the temporal axis of the present and the future. The revelation thus demonstrates that God rules the visible world, and that the present days are leading to an end-time in which divine justice will be done and God's rule will become visible. Mythic images with their roots in texts from the Hebrew Bible and rich in symbolic meaning are a significant characteristic of the genre. Further characteristics include transcendentalism, mythology, pessimistic cosmological and historical surveys, dualism (including a doctrine of two ages and the division of time into periods), numerology (e.g., the "number of the beast" in Revelation), claims of ecstasy and inspiration, and esotericism. 

With the exception of the Apocalypse of John the authors of apocalyptic works released their books under pseudonyms (false names): the Book of Daniel, for example, was composed during the 2nd century BCE but took the name of the legendary Daniel for its hero. Pseudonymity may have been used to secure acceptance for the new works, to protect the real authors from reprisals, or because the authors had experienced what they believed to be genuine revelations from the famous past figure or identified with him and claimed to write on his behalf.

See also

 Apocalypse of John
 Apocalypticism
 Book of Daniel
 Christian eschatology
 Eschatology
 Global catastrophic risk
 Islamic eschatology
 List of dates predicted for apocalyptic events
 Messianic Age
 Ultimate fate of the universe

References

Citations

Bibliography 

 
 
 
 
 
 
 
 
 
 
 
 

 
Christian genres
Christian terminology
Mythology

hr:Kraj svijeta